Hel or HEL may refer to:

Places
 Hel Peninsula, on the Polish Baltic coast
 Hel, Poland, a town on the Hel Peninsula
 Hel Fortified Area, a fortress and naval base on the Hel peninsula
 Helsinki Airport (IATA code HEL)
 Hensall railway station, England (National Rail station code HEL)
 Human Engineering Laboratory, an Army research institute that specialized in ergonomics

In science and technology
 Hardware Emulation Layer, in integrated circuitry
 High energy laser, a weapon
 High energy light

In mythology
 Hel (location), a location in Norse mythology
 Hel (being), ruler of Hel, the location in Norse mythology
 Hel, a battle-axe used by Magnus the Good of Norway

In arts and entertainment
 Hel (band), a Swedish band
 Hel, a character in the 1927 film Metropolis
 Club Hel, a location in the Matrix series
 Hel, a character in the mobile video game Fire Emblem Heroes

Other uses
 History of the English language (education)
 Home equity loan

See also
 Hell (disambiguation)